Abd ol Aziz may refer to:
 Abd ol Aziz, Kermanshah
 Abd ol Aziz, Khash, Sistan and Baluchestan Province